Michael Layton may refer to:

Mike Layton (born 1980), Toronto city councillor
Mike Layton (journalist) (1922–2011), American newspaper journalist
Michael Layton, 2nd Baron Layton (1912–1989), British businessman